Hayden is an unincorporated community in southern Maries County, Missouri, United States.  The community is located on Missouri Route E between Big Bend and Stickney. It is eight miles south of Vienna and approximately sixteen miles northwest of Rolla.

A post office called Hayden was established in 1890, and remained in operation until 1972. Hayden Copeland, an early postmaster, gave the community his first name.

References

Unincorporated communities in Maries County, Missouri
Unincorporated communities in Missouri